Haldra is a genus of pyramidellid gastropod mollusks or micromollusks in the tribe Chrysallidini within the family Pyramidellidae.

Life habits
Little is known about the biology of the members of this genus. As is true of most members of the Pyramidellidae sensu lato, they are likely to be ectoparasites.

Species
Species within the genus Haldra include:
 Haldra photis (Carpenter, 1857) - type species as Odostomia (Chrysallida) photis

References

Further reading 

Pyramidellidae